Frank Martin (born January 21, 1995) is an American professional boxer.

Professional boxing career

Early career

2021
Martin had the first step-up fight of his career on April 20, 2021, as he was booked to face fellow unbeaten prospect Jerry Perez in the main event of a Fox Sports 1 broadcast card, which took place at the Shrine Exposition Hall in Los Angeles, California. He won the fight by a seventh-round knockout, as he floored Perez with a looping left hook. Martin landed more than twice the amount of punches his opponent had, outlanding Perez 100 to 47. He was up on the scorecards at the time of the stoppage, with two judges awarding him every previous round of the bout, while the third judge scored all but one of the rounds in his favor.

Martin was booked to face Ryan Kielczweski in the featured bout of the preliminary portion of the Manny Pacquiao vs. Yordenis Ugás FOX Sports pay-per-view, which took place on August 21, 2021, at the T-Mobile Arena in Paradise, Nevada. He won the fight by a dominant unanimous decision, with all three judges scoring every round of the bout for him. Martin landed 198 total punches throughout the ten-round affair, while Kielczweski was able to land only 54 of the 322 punches he threw.

2022
On December 14, 2021, the Philippines-based Sanman Promotions announced that the twice-defeated Romero Duno would be Frank Martin's next opponent. The fight was scheduled to take place on January 1, 2022, on the undercard of the Luis Ortiz and Charles Martin Showtime pay-per-view. Duno's head coach Osmiri Fernandez threw in the towel at the 2:54 minute mark of the fourth round, after Martin had twice knocked Duno down. He was up 30–27 on all three of the judges' scorecards at the time of the stoppage.

Martin was expected to face the one-time WBA super featherweight title challenger Ricardo Núñez on July 9, 2022, as the opener of the Mark Magsayo versus Rey Vargas Showtime triple-header. Núñez withdrew from the fight on July 5, due to visa issues, and was replaced by the twice-defeated Jackson Maríñez. Martin won the fight by a tenth-round knockout. He twice knocked Maríñez down, once in the ninth and once in the tenth round. Martin was up on the scorecards, with scores of 88–82, 88–82 and 87–83.

Martin faced the unbeaten Michel Rivera on December 17, 2022, at the Cosmopolitan of Las Vegas in Las Vegas, Nevada in the main event of a Showtime broadcast card. Both fighters were ranked as top ten lightweights by The Ring at the time of the bout's booking. He won the fight by unanimous decision, with scores of 120–107, 117–110 and 118–109. Martin scored the sole knockdown of the bout in the seventh round, as the dropped Rivera with a counter left straight.

Professional boxing record

References

Living people
1995 births
21st-century American people
American male boxers
Lightweight boxers
Light-welterweight boxers
Boxers from Detroit